NGC 7199 is a barred spiral galaxy registered in the New General Catalogue. It is located in the direction of the Indus constellation. It was discovered by the English astronomer John Herschel in 1835 using a 47.5 cm (18.7 inch) reflector.

See also 
 List of Messier objects

References 

7199
Astronomical objects discovered in 1835
Indus (constellation)
Barred spiral galaxies
Discoveries by John Herschel